Weligama Sri Sumangala Thero (1825-1905) was an outstanding scholar bhikkhu with many important publications -Hitopadsesa Atthadassi, Hitopadsesa Padarthavykanaya, Upadesa Vinischaya, Siddanta Sekaraya. His work Siddhanta Sekharaya of 700 pages was printed at the Government Press in 1897. He established Saugathodaya Vidyalaya at Rankoth Viharaya in Panadura. 
He was a close associate of Sir Edwin Arnold the author of 'Light of Asia'. He is responsible for encouraging Arnold and Anagarika Dharmapala to advocate for the renovation of Buddhagaya and its return to Buddhist care.

Biography
Weligama Sri Sumangala, a Buddhist High Priest of Ceylon, and a distinguished Oriental scholar whose place it will be hard to fill. He was in his eighty-second year and had led a life of remarkable usefulness. Born in Weligama, he came of one of the oldest and most respected families of the southern provinces. His father intended him to follow the medical profession but a
serious illness compelled him to relinquish the plan, while the suffering he experienced at the time led him to abandon wealth and ease and give his life to the service of humanity. He entered the Buddhist priesthood when only twelve years of age, and received his education under the High Priest Bentota who was one of the most famous Sanskrit scholars of his day.

The Rev. Sumangala belonged to the Amarapura sect of Buddhist priests, and in 1894  His colleagues in Ceylon unanimously elected him as their Chief High Priest, at the same time bestowing upon him a distinguished title. He lived and dressed as did the Buddhist monks at the time of Buddha more than twenty centuries ago, and was a noble representative of the religion of "The Enlightened One" in its original and purest form. His whole life has been characterized by a single-minded devotion to the uplifting of mankind, and he was beloved and appreciated by high and low, Buddhist and Christian. Reports of the impressive ceremonies at his cremation state variously.

Schools named after
 Sri Sumangala College, Panadura
 Sri Sumangala Girls College, Panadura
 Sri Sumangala Boys College, Weligama
 Sri Sumangala Girls College, Weligama

References

British Ceylon period
Sri Lankan Buddhist monks
Theravada Buddhist monks
Sri Lankan Theravada Buddhists
People from British Ceylon
Buddhist revivalists
National Heroes of Sri Lanka
1825 births
1905 deaths
Sinhalese monks